Santa Khurai is a Meitei:  (transgender woman) gender-rights activist, writer, and artist from Manipur, India. She is a member of the Indigenous community of Manipur, the Meitei people. She is the secretary of the All Manipur Nupi Maanbi Association (AMANA).

She filed a public interest litigation (PIL) in the Supreme Court of India challenging the constitutional validity of Clauses 12 and 51 of the Guidelines on Blood Donor Selection and Blood Donor Referral, 2017 issued by the National Transfusion Council and the National Aids Control Organization under the Ministry of Health and Family Welfare.

Khurai has also presented a statement at the 48th United Nations Human Rights Council Session in September 2021 held in Geneva. The statement was made on behalf of lesbian, gay, bisexual, transgender and intersex persons from 14 countries from Global East and Global South. 

Khurai has led trainings of trainers on international human rights law. She has also created films Men Shaman of Manipur - Nupa Amaibi supported by Heinrich-Böll-Stiftung, released in 2021 and Nawa – The Spirit of Atey, which won the best film award in the non-fiction film competition section at the Nagaland Film Festival 2019.

Activism

Public Interest Litigation: Constitutionality of Blood Donation Guidelines 
Santa Khurai filed a Public Interest Litigation (PIL) Thangjam Santa Singh @ Santa Khurai vs Union of India & Ors. in the Supreme Court of India in March 2021. The PIL challenges Clause 12 and 51 of Guidelines on Blood Donor Selection and Blood Donor Referral issued by the National Blood Transfusion Council (NBTC) and the National AIDS Control Organisation (NACO) in 2017. These clauses permanently banned transgender persons, men who have sex with men, and female sex workers from donating blood. The guidelines considered this group of persons as "at risk" for HIV, Hepatitis B and Hepatitis C infections. Khurai pointed out that the effect of these guidelines was felt the most during the pandemic when transgender persons were unable to donate blood to other members of their community during emergencies.

Khurai sought to strike down Clause 12 and 51 of the Guidelines as unconstitutional and in violation of Articles 14, 15 and 21 of the Constitution of India, 1950. She argued that the grounds for the permanent ban were arbitrary, discriminatory and unscientific. Imposition of a life-long ban on certain marginalized sections, instead of a three-month or 45-day deferral from the last high-risk sexual contact, or just screening their blood as per the usual norms — ends up in stigmatizing the said communities as they are not based on how HIV-transmission actually works, nor are they based on the actual risks involved in specific activities and lets the individuals who may still engage in high-risk behavior donate.

The permanent ban violates Article 14 and 15 which ensure Equality of All Persons and prohibits discrimination as it:

a) Deprives transgender persons, gay and bisexual men, and female sex workers the right to donate blood and considers them ‘at risk’ is based on gender identity and sexual orientation

b)There is no correlation between the goal to make blood donation safe, and the exclusion of said group of persons, and

c) Basis for exclusion is negative stereotypes in society against this group of persons.

The Supreme Court has issued notice to the Respondents and the case is currently pending.

The All Manipur Nupi Maanbi Association (AMANA) 
In 2010, Khurai was invited to be part of a Universal Periodic Review (UPR) working session, a UN human rights initiative, in Delhi. Upon her return to Manipur, she became the Secretary of the All Manipur Nupi Maanbi Association (AMANA), a coalition working towards raising awareness of trans rights in Manipur.

Soon after Khurai joined, AMANA organised the Trans Queen Contest North East, to use fashion and beauty to bring the trans community forward and help expand the AMANA network in the region.

AMANA also organised the distribution of phaneks worn by mothers which were collected by allies for trans women as a symbol of encouragement and acceptance.

Along with Solidarity and Action Against HIV Infection in India (SAATHII), AMANA co-implemented a short-term research-based project titled "Pheida - Gender at the Periphery" that sought to study elements in the history of gender inclusivity in Manipuri society.

She has spoken about how the caste system comprising identities such as Savarna, Vaishya and Shudra, is detached from Meitei realities.

Manipur's First Transgender Women's Grievance Cell
Under the aegis of the Manipur State Commission for Women, Khurai played an instrumental role in setting up Manipur's first Transgender Women's Grievance Cell, which works to eradicate structural and institutionalised discrimination against trans women and help them access and navigate the judicial and law enforcement systems in Manipur. Cases reported to the Cell are directed to the State Women Commission who can then escalate them to the Social Welfare Department or a relevant body for intervention. Santa Khurai heads the Cell, along with Bonita Pebam, Roro Khumanthem, and Zen Pui.

Other Advocacy Efforts 
Growing up in a home with no support from her parents, Khurai set up the first beauty salon run by a trans person in Manipur in the 1990s in order to support herself. The salon's success inspired others in the trans community to open their own salons and provide livelihood opportunities for others. In the 90s, she also led a  dance team called the "Seven Sisters".

Khurai has been working on gender and sexual minorities rights issues for the last twenty years. She is also associated with Solidarity and Action Against HIV Infection in India (SAATHII), and was a fellow at the Asia Pacific Trans Network (APTN) and RFSL Sweden.

At the 48th Human Rights Council Session held in Geneva in September 2021, Khurai presented a statement to the Special Rapporteur on Water and Sanitation on behalf of LGBTI persons from 14 countries from the Global East and Global South. Her statement highlighted issues faced by the LGBTIQ+ community related to democratic access to safe water and sanitation, including violations of rights to safe water and sanitation, due to a range of harmful norms and stereotypes. She also highlighted the adverse effects of water privatization and climate change, water crises and contamination, and how these disproportionately impact indigenous trans persons. Her statement sought the Special Rapporteur to engage and consult with LGBTI persons from underrepresented regions on these issues.

Khurai also advocated for separate toilets for transgender persons during the Sangai Film Festival. The State Tourism Department accepted the proposal to provide such toilets in order to alleviate the difficulties that the community faces in addressing public toilets. This was the first time that separate toilets for trans persons were assured during a festival in the region.

Khurai has also helped many trans persons in Manipur get their gender identity legally updated through the necessary documentation, enabling them to avail passports with trans identification.

Covid-19 efforts 
She filed a PIL seeking inclusion of the trans community into covid-relief scheme that aimed to uplift lives of residents during the pandemic. The Manipur High Court (HC) directed the state government to include transgender communities within the COVID-19 Affected Livelihood Support Scheme, after her PIL.

They also set up dedicated quarantine centres for stranded members of the transgender community who are returning to the state amid a nationwide lockdown. Two separate quarantine spaces, including a dedicated centre for the trans community was set up in Imphal. This happened only after Khurai's PIL and is possibly a first of such step taken for the trans community there.

Khurai's other efforts for covid include organising a crowdfunding campaign for children to raise funds for gadgets to help them study online during the pandemic.

Media and Publications

Writings 
Khurai is the author of several articles documenting the experiences of Manipur's  and their tradition. She is also one of the authors of Pheida – Gender at Periphery highlighting the history of gender diversity and inclusivity in the Manipuri society. The book was released by traditional scholar, Chanam Hemchandra Khaba in November, 2020.

Khurai is a poet, contributing two poems, "My Father" and "" to the queer anthology, The World That Belongs to Us, presenting heterogeneous and plural South Asian voices talking about the world and their experiences of queerness.

Khurai has also contributed to the book COVID-19 Assemblages: Queer and Feminist Ethnographies from South Asia (2022), published by Routledge India with a poem titled "Looming".

Films and Podcasts 
Khurai and Amar Maibam made a documentary film titled Nawa – The Spirit of Atey  that won the best film award in the non-fiction film competition section at the Nagaland Film Festival 2019. The film traces the realities of Atey, a transgender boy belonging to the Meitei community, explores his home-life and adolescent conversations, the challenges and support he receives towards his gender preference and expression. The film also talks about how the communities negotiate with their own biases to give a better life to their trans children.

Within  there are men, women, and transgender shamans.

References

Further reading
  Photo essay
 
  News article on views of the National Socialist Council of Nagaland

Indian activists
21st-century Indian poets
Indian artists
People from Manipur
Transgender rights activists
Indian women poets
Year of birth missing (living people)
Living people